Flemming Ørnskov (born 1957/58) is a Danish businessman. He has been the chief executive officer (CEO) of Galderma since October 2019. 

He was previously the CEO of Shire plc, a FTSE 100 specialty biopharmaceutical company as of 30 April 2013, succeeding Angus Russel. He previously worked for Bayer, Bausch & Lomb and Novartis.

He is also the chairman of Waters Corporation. 

Ørnskov received his MD from the University of Copenhagen, followed by an MBA from INSEAD, and a Master of Public Health (MPH) from Harvard University.

Awards 
Top 100 Best-Performing CEOs in the World, 2015 - Harvard Business Review

Top 25 Most Influential People in Biopharma Today, 2013 - Fierce Biotech

References

1950s births
Living people
Year of birth missing (living people)
University of Copenhagen alumni
INSEAD alumni
Harvard School of Public Health alumni
Danish chief executives